Hamilton Centre is a federal electoral district in Hamilton, Ontario, Canada, that has been represented in the House of Commons of Canada since 2004.

History
It was created in 2003 from parts of Hamilton East, Hamilton West and Ancaster—Dundas—Flamborough—Aldershot ridings.

This riding lost territory to Hamilton West—Ancaster—Dundas and gained territory from Hamilton East—Stoney Creek during the 2012 electoral redistribution.

Geography

Consisting of that part of the City of Hamilton described as follows: commencing at the intersection of James Mountain Road with the Niagara Escarpment; thence generally westerly along said escarpment to the electric power transmission line situated westerly of Chateau Court; thence northerly along said transmission line to Highway No. 403; thence generally northeasterly along said highway to the Desjardins Canal; thence easterly along said canal and continuing due east in Hamilton Harbour to the northerly production of Queen Street North; thence northerly in a straight line along said production to the northerly limit of said city; thence generally northeasterly, southeasterly and northeasterly along said limit to the northerly production of Ottawa Street North; thence southerly along said production and Ottawa Street North to Burlington Street East; thence easterly along said street to Kenilworth Avenue North; thence southerly along said avenue and Kenilworth Avenue South to Lawrence Road; thence westerly along said road to the southerly production of Keswick Court; thence southerly along said production to the Niagara Escarpment; thence generally westerly along said escarpment to the point of commencement.

Demographics
According to the Canada 2021 Census

Ethnic groups: 69.5% White, 8.1% Black, 4.3% South Asian, 4.1% Indigenous, 2.4% Southeast Asian, 2.4% Latin American, 2.1% Chinese, 2.1% Filipino, 1.9% Arab, 1.2% Multiple
Languages: 77.2% English, 2.2% Spanish, 2.1% French, 2.1% Portuguese, 2.0% Arabic, 1.1% Vietnamese, 1.0% Italian 
Religions: 43.9% Christian (21.8% Catholic, 3.4% Anglican, 2.1% United Church, 1.4% Christian Orthodox, 1.4% Presbyterian, 1.2% Baptist, 1.0% Pentecostal, 11.5% Other Christian), 6.2% Muslim, 2.0% Hindu, 1.5% Buddhist, 44.2% None. 
Median income: $35,200 (2020) 
Average income: $44,560 (2020)

Members of Parliament

Hamilton Centre has been represented in the House of Commons of Canada by New Democrat Matthew Green since the 2019 federal election. Prior to that, the riding was held by David Christopherson, also of the NDP, from the 2004 federal election to 2019, after also holding the seat provincially from 1990 to 1999. The riding is considered an NDP "stronghold".

Election results

See also
 List of Canadian federal electoral districts
 Past Canadian electoral districts

References

Riding history from the Library of Parliament
 Campaign expense data from Elections Canada

Notes

Ontario federal electoral districts
Politics of Hamilton, Ontario
2003 establishments in Ontario